Zodarion affine is a spider species found in Spain.

See also
 List of Zodariidae species

References

External links

affine
Spiders of Europe
Spiders described in 1870